The Cannon Corners–Covey Hill Border Crossing connects the towns of Havelock, Quebec to Mooers Forks, New York on the Canada–US border. It can be reached by Quebec Route 203 on the Canadian side and by Cannon Corners Road on the American side. The United States completed work on a new border station in 2012.

History
Until 1974, the US had no border inspection station at this crossing.   The US Customs Service operated an office in rented space inside a small duplex storefront near Ellenburg, New York and people entering the US were expected to travel there to report for inspection.  Canada built a two-story Cape Cod-style border station around 1950.  This border station was replaced by a single-story structure in 2011. The previous border station was subsequently demolished.

See also
 List of Canada–United States border crossings

References

Canada–United States border crossings
Geography of Montérégie
Geography of Clinton County, New York
1925 establishments in New York (state)
1925 establishments in Quebec